Synuchus ishigakiensis is a species of ground beetle in the subfamily Harpalinae. It was described by Morita & Toyoda in 2003.

References

Synuchus
Beetles described in 2003